America's Book of Secrets is a documentary series about mysterious or little known aspects of U.S. history, theories about secrets that are possibly being hidden from the public, and hidden sources of the social issues that face the country. Episodes deal with topics such as government coverups, organized crime gangs, the War on Drugs, white supremacy movements, cults, presidential assassinations and coup attempts, terrorist attacks, extraterrestrials, Bigfoot, government surveillance, covert military operations, secret societies and American oligarchs.

The series is ranked #5 in popularity among History Vault programs.

The series has been acclaimed as one of the best conspiracy documentaries on Netflix.

On April 27, 2021, Lance Reddick announced on Facebook that he would host season 4.

Episodes

Series overview

Season 1 (2012)

Season 2 (2013)

Season 3 (2014)

Season 4 (2021)

References

2012 American television series debuts
American documentary television series
Television series about the history of the United States